Kjell Storvik (born 20 November 1930) is a Norwegian economist and former Governor of the Central Bank of Norway.

He is a cand.oecon. by education. From 1977 to 1981 he was the vice president of the Norwegian Shipowners' Association. He was then State Secretary in the Ministry of Finance for four years. He was appointed Vice Governor of the Central Bank of Norway. When Governor Torstein Moland was forced to resign, Storvik became acting Governor, only to get the job on a permanent basis the next year.

References

1930 births
Living people
Governors of the Central Bank of Norway
Norwegian economists
Norwegian state secretaries
Conservative Party (Norway) politicians